Cedarmount may refer to:

Cedarmont (album), an album of Lawson (band)
Cedarmont (Williamson County, Tennessee), historic house listed on the U.S. National Register of Historic Places